NTR Telugu Desam Party (Lakshmi Parvathi) (NTRTDP (LP)) is a regional political party in the India state of Andhra Pradesh. The party was founded by Lakshmi Parvathi, the widow of the film star and Telugu Desam Party politician N.T. Rama Rao. Parvathi formed the party after the internal coup in which NTR's son-in-law Chandrababu Naidu took control over TDP in 1995.

Initially NTRTDP(LP) appeared to be able to challenge the TDP of Naidu. In the 1996 Lok Sabha elections NTRTDP(LP) launched candidates in all 42 constituencies in Andhra Pradesh. It won 3,249,267 votes (10.66% of the votes in the state and 0.97% of the vote in the nation as a whole). However, it could not win a single seat.

In 1998, the party had the backing of the Bharatiya Janata Party (BJP). NTRTDP (LP) nominated five candidates, who together got 384,211 votes (1.2% of the votes in the state). In the Srikakulam (Assembly Constituency) the party candidate got more than 30% of the votes.

After the 1998 elections, NTRTDP(LP) declined rapidly and many leaders left the party. BJP became an ally of the arch-enemy Naidu. In the 1999 Lok Sabha elections NTRTDP(LP) launched 13 candidates, who together mustered 61635 votes (0,18% of the votes in the state). In the state assembly elections the same year NTRTDP(LP) nominated 71 candidate, but who together only got 53,259 votes (0,65% of the votes in total).

In the 2004 Lok Sabha elections the party only launched a single candidate, Sivanatha Reddy Chadipiralla in Cuddahpah. Reddy only received 759 votes (0,09% of the votes in that constituency). In the state assembly elections that were held simultaneously NTRTDP(LP) had launched 18 candidates, unsuccessfully. Lakshmi Parvathi herself only got 946 votes in the Atmakur constituency. However, in spite of the fact that the electoral result was a failure for the party, Parvathi was very satisfied with the result since Naidu's TDP had been ousted. Only after Naidu's humiliating defeat she let spread the ashes of her husband at Haridwar, eight years after his death.

Lakshmi Parvathi is the NTRTDP(LP) president.

References

Political parties in Andhra Pradesh
1996 establishments in Andhra Pradesh
Political parties established in 1996